Boris Pregel (24 January 1893 – 7 December 1976) was a Russian Empire-born Jewish engineer and dealer in uranium and radium.  He was born in Odessa, in the Russian Empire, and studied engineering in Belgium at the Free University of Brussels and the University of Liège. He served in the Russian army in World War I, entering as a private soldier and rising to the rank of colonel of engineers. He was put in charge of Russia's only aircraft factory. He moved to Paris after the October Revolution.

In Paris he came in contact with Edgar Sengier, a Belgian mining engineer, who was effectively in charge of the mining company, Union Minière, in the Belgian Congo.  Pregel became interested in the radium department of this company. From the 1920s to the Second World War Pregel and Sengier controlled the world's supply of radium. He also promoted the building of many radio-therapy installations, including the Queen Sofia Hospital (Sophiahemmet) in Sweden. He ensured that Marie Curie was lent a five-gram radium source which was used in some of her important experiments.

His first wife, the daughter of a Saint Petersburg lawyer, predeceased him. In 1937 he remarried to the artist Alexandra Avksentiev, the daughter of Nikolai Avksentiev. In 1939 he was awarded the French Legion of Honour in recognition of his role as the head of the International Organisation to Fight Cancer. The couple fled to New York in 1940, after the Nazi invasion of France.

After his arrival in the US he established, with his brother Alexander, the Canadian Radium and Uranium Corp of New York and became its president to sell the newly discovered rich ores in northern Canada, and later also in Colorado. George B. Pegram and his associates at Columbia University, who did some of the initial work on the Manhattan Project, sought Pregel's assistance because they did not have sufficient money to buy the uranium. Pregel gave them the first uranium used in the experiments. Pregel's company also built radioactive neutron sources and radioactive luminescent signs.

Pregel was also the agent for the Canadian Eldorado Mining & Refining Co. which supplied the Manhattan Project with nearly all the uranium mined in North America. He also sold 0.23 tonnes of uranium oxide to the Soviet Union during the war, with the authorization of the U.S. government.

In March 1945 the Canadian Foreign Exchange Control Board began formal hearings into Pregel's financial dealings. The case was settled out of court but Pregel and the other defendants paid over $1 million in cash and other assets to settle. Furthermore, Pregel agreed to terminate his agency agreement between Eldorado and the Canadian Radium & Uranium Corp.

He served as president and board chairman of the New York Academy of Sciences, as president
of the French University (Ecole Libre) in New York, as trustee of the New School for Social Research and as vice-president of the American Geographical Society. He received several honorary degrees and foreign decorations. Pregel founded the Boris Pregel Awards for science, awarded by the New York Academy of Sciences.

References

External links 
Photo
Dialogue for a play

1893 births
1976 deaths
Manhattan Project people
American mining businesspeople
Emigrants from the Russian Empire to the United States
Emigrants from the Russian Empire to France
Free University of Brussels (1834–1969) alumni
University of Liège alumni